Semax is a drug which is used mostly in Russia and Ukraine for a broad range of conditions but predominantly for its purported nootropic, neuroprotective, and neurorestorative properties. Semax has not been evaluated, approved for use, or marketed in most other countries.

Medical uses

Semax has undergone extensive study in Russia and is on the Russian List of Vital & Essential Drugs approved by the Russian Federation government on December 7, 2011. Medical uses for Semax include treatment of stroke, transient ischemic attack, memory and cognitive disorders, peptic ulcers, optic nerve disease, and to boost the immune system.

Pharmacology

Pharmacodynamics
In animals, Semax rapidly elevates the levels and expression of brain-derived neurotrophic factor (BDNF) and its signaling receptor TrkB in the hippocampus, and rapidly activates serotonergic and dopaminergic brain systems. Accordingly, it has been found to produce antidepressant-like and anxiolytic-like effects, attenuate the behavioral effects of exposure to chronic stress, and potentiate the locomotor activity produced by D-amphetamine. As such, it has been suggested that Semax may be effective in the treatment of depression.

Though the exact mechanism of action of Semax is unclear, there is evidence that it may act through melanocortin receptors. Specifically, there is a report of Semax competitively antagonizing the action of the melanocortin receptor full agonist α-melanocyte-stimulating hormone (α-MSH) at the MC4 and MC5 receptors in both in vitro and in vivo experimental conditions, indicating that it may act as an antagonist or partial agonist of these receptors. Semax did not antagonize α-MSH at the MC3 receptor, though this receptor could still be a target of the drug. As for the MC1 and MC2 receptors, they were not assayed. In addition to actions at receptors, Semax, as well as a related peptide drug, Selank, have been found to inhibit enzymes involved in the degradation of enkephalins and other endogenous regulatory peptides (IC50 = 10 μM), though the clinical significance of this property is uncertain.

Pharmacokinetics
As a peptide, Semax has poor oral bioavailability and hence is administered parenterally as a nasal spray or subcutaneous injection.

Human trials 
In a 2018 study involving healthy participants, Semax was shown to increase fMRI default mode network activity relative to placebo.

In an earlier 1996 study, 250-1000 ug/kg of Semax improved attention and short term memory in healthy subjects performing 8 hour work shifts, though the effects were most pronounced when subjects were fatigued (after the shift was over) and the effects lasted going into the next day. In the memory test administered the morning after Semax administration, the treatment group made more correct responses (71%) than the control group (41%).

Both of the aforementioned studies had small sample sizes of 24 and 11 participants respectively.

A study involving 110 patients recovering from ischemic stroke reported increases in BDNF (correlated with early rehabilitation) in patients administered Semax.

As of September 2022, there are no published human trials involving Semax outside of Russia and Post-Soviet states.

Chemistry
Semax is a heptapeptide and synthetic analogue of a fragment of adrenocorticotropic hormone (ACTH), ACTH (4-10), of the following amino acid sequence: Met-Glu-His-Phe-Pro-Gly-Pro ( in single-letter form).

References

Drugs with unknown mechanisms of action
Enkephalinase inhibitors
Melanocortin receptor antagonists
Neuroprotective agents
Peptides
Russian drugs